Kevin Thomas (born 8 May 1980, in Swansea) is a professional Welsh darts player who competes in Professional Darts Corporation events. He uses the nickname The Undertaker for his matches due to him being of fan of WWE's Undertaker.

BDO career
Kevin Thomas has been playing darts from the early age of 6, but started out properly as a 15 year old Glamorgan Youth Player in 1995. He got picked for The Wales Youth Team in 1995,1996 and 1997 and throughout his Youth years, he was a dominant force in Youth darts winning the Southern Inter Counties Under 18 Youth Averages 2 times and the Under 21 Averages 2 times. In 1999, Thomas reached the final of the British Teenage Open where he lost 3–1 against Matt Chapman. He competed consistently in BDO County Men's 'A' games for Glamorgan and played for Wales Men 28 times with 15 wins from those appearances. He also competed in BDO tournament events in the coming years with his best success reaching the last 24 televised stage of The 2011 Winmau World Masters where he lost out to Steve Douglas 2–0. He also represented Wales in the 4 man Wales World Cup Squad in The Republic of Ireland in 2011 where he lost in the last 64 of the Men's Singles to Finland's Jarkko Komula.

PDC career
After a brief spell in the mid 2000s in the early days of the PDC which involved going around different Greene King pubs to qualify for events, Thomas rejoined the 'reformed' PDC in 2013 and hit his first competitive nine-dart finish whilst playing in the second UK Open Qualifier against Peter Hudson. He qualified for the UK Open in Bolton for the first time at the first time of asking through the UK Open Order Of Merit and lost out to Conan Whitehead in the second round. Thomas' best result of his career to date came at the 2014 Dutch Darts Masters where he beat Wayne Jones 6–1 and Steve Beaton 6–5, before he lost 6–4 to Mervyn King in the last 16 earning £2,000 in the process. Thomas matched this run at the sixth Players Championship of the year by beating Peter Hudson, Andy Hamilton and Ronnie Baxter, but was then eliminated 6–4 by Kyle Anderson.

Another last 16 defeat came in 2015 at the second Players Championship event, 6–5 at the hands of James Wade, but Thomas went one better at the fourth event by reaching his first PDC quarter-final. He came through a trio of deciding leg games against Magnus Caris, Andy Smith and Andy Boulton and beat Andy Hamilton 6–3, before losing 6–1 to world number one Michael van Gerwen.

His best result of 2016 came at the Dutch Darts Masters, where he beat Jan Dekker 6–3, before losing by a reversal of this scoreline to Dave Chisnall in the second round picking up £1,500 in the process. Other than that he reached the last 64 in three more events during the year. Thomas still competes regularly on the PDC circuit and currently holds the record for the most wins in Q School whilst not officially owning a full PDC tour card. Thomas still regularly enters the Q School, Pro Tour and Euro Tour events (OOM circumstances permitting) but due to a lack of serious sponsorship in recent years, he hasn't entered so many. At the moment, Thomas is currently an associate member of the PDC which means he is a regular on The PDC Challenge Tour and his aim is to get as high up in these ranking events to secure a full time PDC Pro Tour Card to enter more professional PDC events in the future and to get back to where he knows he deserves to be playing. Aside from that, Thomas still plays his local darts in his home town of Swansea where he has been dominating the Super Leagues and Local Leagues he plays in for many years. Thomas is also a multiple time tournament winner and has won countless local and Welsh Ranking Tournaments around the Welsh valleys. Thomas recently starred in the Welsh Darts Program Oci Oci Oci which aired on S4C on 22 June 2019.

References

External links

Living people
Professional Darts Corporation associate players
Welsh darts players
1980 births
British Darts Organisation players
Sportspeople from Swansea